Ranks of the Czechoslovak Armed Forces shows the military ranks and rank insignia in use by the First, Second, Third, and Fourth Czechoslovak Republic.

Overview
After the independence of Czechoslovakia, the new republic at first used the ranks of the Austro-Hungarian Army, but from 1920 a system was introduced that was basically similar to the one used presently by today's Army of the Czech Republic.

Ranks (1918–1919)

Officers

Other ranks

Ranks (1919–1920)

Officers, officials and cadets

Other ranks

Ranks (1920–1929)

Officers

NCO and enlisted

Ranks (1930–1939)

Officers

NCOs and enlisted

Ranks (1945–1950)

Officers

NCOs and enlisted

Ranks (1951–1959)

Officers
<noinclude>

Other ranks
<noinclude>

Ranks (1960–1990)

Officers

Warrant officers, NCOs and enlisted

See also
Government Army (Bohemia and Moravia)

References
Citations

Bibliography

 
 
 
 
 

Military of Czechoslovakia
Czechoslovakia